Hanoch Bartov (13 August 1926 – 13 December 2016) was an Israeli author and journalist.

Biography 
Hanoch Helfgott (Bartov) was born in Petah Tikva in 1926, a year after his parents immigrated from Poland. He attended a religious school and then the Ahad Haam gymnasium. After working in diamond polishing and welding for two years, he enlisted in 1943, at the age of 17, in the Palestine Regiment of the British Army. He spent three years in the Jewish Brigade, first in Palestine and then in Italy and the Netherlands, where he served as a medic, caring for Holocaust survivors in DP camps.

After World War II, Bartov studied Jewish and general history at the Hebrew University of Jerusalem. During the War of Independence he served in field army units and the Israel Defense Forces in Jerusalem. He lived for four years on Kibbutz Ein Hahoresh, working as a farmhand and a teacher. From 1966 to 1968, Bartov served as a cultural advisor in the Israeli embassy in London.

Literary career 
Bartov published his first story in 1945, when he was a 19-year-old soldier in Europe. In his writing, as a journalist and novelist, Bartov describes his first contacts with survivors of the Holocaust. The Brigade is a fictionalized account of the operation of the Jewish Brigade.

Awards 
Among the various prizes received by Bartov for his work are the following:
 In 1985, the Bialik Prize for literature;
 In 2006, the Agnon Prize;
 In 2010, the Israel Prize, for literature.

Books published in English 
 The Brigade (1967), translation of Pitzei Bagrut (1965)
 Everyone Had Six Wings (1974), translation of Shesh Kenafaim Le-Echad (1954)
 An Israeli at the Court of St. James (1971), translation of Arba Yisraelim Be-Hatzer Saint James (1969)
 Whose Little Boy Are You? (1978), translation of Shel Mi Ata Yeled (1970)
 Dado, 48 years 20 days (1981), translation of Dado, 48 Shanim Ve-Od 20 Yom (1978). Note: An updated and expanded edition of this book was published in Hebrew in 2002 but has not yet been translated to English.

See also 
List of Israel Prize recipients

References 

1926 births
2016 deaths
Jews in Mandatory Palestine
Israeli Jews
Israeli people of Polish-Jewish descent
Hebrew University of Jerusalem alumni
People from Petah Tikva
Israel Prize in literature recipients
Israeli novelists
Israeli journalists
Mandatory Palestine military personnel of World War II
International Writing Program alumni
Jewish Brigade personnel
Recipients of Prime Minister's Prize for Hebrew Literary Works